Roméo Bébé Kambou (born July 1, 1982) is a Burkinabé former professional footballer who played as a midfielder.

International career
Kambou was a member of the Burkinabé 2004 African Nations Cup team, who finished bottom of their group in the first round of competition, thus failing to secure qualification for the quarter-finals.

References

Living people
1982 births
People from Hauts-Bassins Region
Association football midfielders
Burkinabé footballers
Burkina Faso international footballers
Burkinabé expatriate footballers
ASFA Yennenga players
RC Bobo Dioulasso players
Rail Club du Kadiogo players
FC Rouen players
FC Montceau Bourgogne players
AS Cherbourg Football players
FC Martigues players
Louhans-Cuiseaux FC players
Burkinabé expatriate sportspeople in France
Expatriate footballers in France
2002 African Cup of Nations players
2004 African Cup of Nations players
21st-century Burkinabé people